Josie & Jack is a 2019 American tragedy drama film directed by Sarah Lancaster and starring Olivia DeJonge and Alex Neustaedter.  It is based on Kelly Braffet's 2005 novel of the same name.  It is also Lancaster's directorial debut.

Premise
Seventeen-year old Josie, and her older brother Jack, are homeschooled and raised by their abusive alcoholic physics professor father, but they dream of escaping their life of bleak isolation.

Cast

Production
The film was shot in Staten Island.

References

External links
 
 

2019 directorial debut films
2019 drama films
2019 independent films
2019 films
American drama films
American independent films
Films about dysfunctional families
Films based on American novels
Films set in Pennsylvania
Films shot in New York City
Incest in film
Works about homeschooling and unschooling
2010s English-language films
2010s American films